Blaine Thurier (born 1967) is a Canadian musician and film producer. He played synthesizer with the Canadian indie pop supergroup The New Pornographers from their inception in 1997 up to 2021. He also directed several music videos for the band during his tenure. Thurier has written and directed feature films, which have been screened at the Toronto International Film Festival (TIFF), South by Southwest Film Festival, Slamdance and other festivals. Thurier served as a 2011 panelist for the TIFF.

Personal life
Thurier was born in 1967 Estevan, Saskatchewan, Canada. He lives in Vancouver with his wife and son.

Career
Thurier considers filmmaking his main creative outlet, while treating music as a job. He plays synthesizer with the Canadian indie pop supergroup The New Pornographers. Thurier has directed three of the band's videos "Use It", "All For Swinging You Around" and "The Laws Have Changed".

Feature films
Thurier's first full-length feature Low Self-Esteem Girl premiered at the September 2000 Toronto International Film Festival. Thurier used the attention from his film debut to promote The New Pornographers who were still a few months away from releasing their debut album Mass Romantic. The film was awarded Best Narrative Feature at the South by Southwest Film Festival.

Thurier's second full-length feature, a comedy, Male Fantasy received a nomination at the Toronto International Film Festival. It was released to DVD in 2008. A Gun to the Head, a crime comedy, was Thurier's third full-length feature film. Thurier's fourth film 12 Takes was made in 2010. It is a short documentary.

Filmography

Music videos

Features

Shorts
2010 – 12 Takes
2020 – Sing, O Muse

See also

Canadian rock
List of Canadian musicians
List of Canadian directors

References

External links

 The New Pornographers at CBC Radio 3
 The New Pornographers official website

Date of birth missing (living people)
1967 births
Living people
People from Estevan
Canadian indie rock musicians
Canadian rock keyboardists
Musicians from Vancouver
Writers from Vancouver
The New Pornographers members
Film directors from Saskatchewan
Film producers from Saskatchewan
Canadian male screenwriters
Musicians from Saskatchewan
Writers from Saskatchewan
Film directors from Vancouver
20th-century Canadian keyboardists
21st-century Canadian keyboardists
Film producers from British Columbia